Morton Frederick Eden, 1st Baron Henley  (8 July 1752 – 6 December 1830), was a British diplomat.

Eden was a younger son of Sir Robert Eden, 3rd Baronet, and was educated at Eton and Christ Church, Oxford. From 1776 to 1779, he was Minister to Bavaria, then to Copenhagen 1779–1782, Dresden 1783–1791, Berlin 1791–1793 and Vienna 1793–1794. From 1794 to 1795, he was Ambassador to Spain, and returned as Minister to Vienna in 1794–1799. He then retired with a pension of £2000.

In 1799, Eden was created Baron Henley, after having been knighted in 1791 and admitted to the Privy Council in 1794. On 7 August 1783, he had married Lady Elizabeth Henley (the youngest daughter of the 1st Earl of Northington) and they had four children. Lord Henley died in 1830 and was succeeded by his eldest surviving son, Robert.

References
G. B. Smith, ‘Eden, Morton, first Baron Henley (1752–1830)’, rev. Roland Thorne, Oxford Dictionary of National Biography, (Oxford University Press, 2004; online edn, May 2008), Retrieved 22 September 2008.

External links

1752 births
1830 deaths
Alumni of Christ Church, Oxford
Barons in the Peerage of Ireland
Peers of Ireland created by George III
Diplomatic peers
Morton Eden
Knights Grand Cross of the Order of the Bath
Members of the Privy Council of Great Britain
People educated at Eton College
Eden, Morton
Fellows of the Royal Society
Ambassadors of Great Britain to Denmark
Ambassadors of Great Britain to Spain
Ambassadors to Bavaria
Ambassadors of Great Britain to the Holy Roman Emperor
Barons Henley